Bu Ashira is a neighborhood of Manama, Bahrain.

Overview
It consists mostly of residential apartments and villas with a couple of high-rise hybrid apartments.  It is also home to a large number of diplomatic missions of foreign countries such as:
Embassy of Palestine,
Embassy of The People's Democratic Republic of Algeria,
Embassy of The Syrian Arab Republic,
Embassy of Yemen,
Embassy of The Democratic Socialist Republic of Sri Lanka,
Embassy of The Arab Republic Of Egypt,
Embassy of The Republic of Turkey,
Embassy of The Republic of the Philippines, 
Embassy of The Islamic Republic of Iran,

Neighborhoods of Manama